Tatyou is a village in the Thyou Department of Boulkiemdé Province in central western Burkina Faso. It has a population of 727.

References

Populated places in Boulkiemdé Province